This is a record of Romania's results at the FIFA World Cup. Romania have participated at 7 of 21 final tournaments of the World Cup. They were one of the few European participants at the inaugural edition held in Uruguay in 1930. The best performance of the team was in 1994 in United States, when Romania reached quarter-finals after defeating Diego Maradona's Argentina. They eventually lost to Sweden after a penalty shoot-out. The last time Romania qualified was in 1998 in France, when they reached the round of 16, losing to Croatia. The team's top scorer at the World Cup is Florin Răducioiu, with 4 goals, all scored in 1994.

Record at the FIFA World Cup

*Draws include knockout matches decided via penalty shoot-out

By Match

Record by Opponent

Record players

Gheorghe Popescu and Gheorghe Hagi, Romania's top World Cup players, were team-mates at Steaua, Barcelona and Galatasaray. They became brother-in-laws when Hagi married Popescu's sister.

Top goalscorers

See also

 
Countries at the FIFA World Cup
World